Liliane Ennabli is a Franco-Tunisian historian, archaeologist and epigrapher, a specialist in the history of the Christian period of the archaeological site of Carthage.

Research Fellow at the Centre national de la recherche scientifique (CNRS) and centre de recherches Tenain de Villemont on Early Christianity and late Antiquity at the Université Paris-Sorbonne, she conducted excavations of Christian monuments as part of the international campaign of UNESCO intended to save the ancient city (1972–1992), the basilica of Carthagenna and the monastery of Bigua. She published the corpus of Christian inscriptions from Carthage.

Publications 
1975: Les inscriptions funéraires chrétiennes de Carthage, éd. École française de Rome
1997: Carthage, une métropole chrétienne du IVe à la fin du VIIe siècle, coll. Études d'antiquités africaines, éd. du CNRS, Paris
2000: Catalogue des inscriptions chrétiennes sur pierre du musée du Bardo, éd. Institut national du patrimoine, Tunis
2000: La basilique de Carthagenna et le locus des sept moines de Gafsa. Nouveaux édifices chrétiens de Carthage, vol. I, coll. Études d'antiquités africaines, éd. du CNRS, Paris, (read online)
2000: Carthage : actualités des fouilles dans le domaine paléochrétien, Antiquités africaines, vol. 36, n°1, 2000, pp. 161–183 (read online)

External links 
 Liliane Ennabli on data.bnf.fr 
 La basilique de Carthagenna et le locus des sept moines de Gafsa. Nouveaux édifices chrétiens de Carthage on Centre Camille Julian
  Carthage. Une métropole chrétienne du IVe à la fin du VIIe siècle on Persée

French archaeologists
French women archaeologists
Tunisian archaeologists
Tunisian women archaeologists
French epigraphers
Living people
20th-century French historians
French women historians
20th-century Tunisian historians
20th-century French women writers
Year of birth missing (living people)